Darreh Dur (also Romanized as Darreh Dūr; also known as Dareh Dar, Darehdor-e Bālā, Dareh Dorr-e Bālā, Darreh Dar-e Bālā, and Darreh Dor) is a village in Darreh Doran Rural District, in the Central District of Rafsanjan County, Kerman Province, Iran. At the 2006 census, its population was 509, in 138 families.

References 

Populated places in Rafsanjan County